Kyzyltan (Qyzyltañ) is a village (selo) in Zerendi District, Akmola Region, in northern part of Kazakhstan. The KATO code is 115652400.

Demographics

Population 
Population:  (255 males and 253 females). As of 2009, the population of Kyzyltan was 394 inhabitants (193 males and 201 females).

References

Notes

Populated places in Akmola Region